The 1985 Toronto Argonauts finished in fourth place in the East Division with a 6–10 record and failed to make the playoffs.

Offseason

Regular season

Standings

Schedule

Awards and honours

1985 CFL All-Stars

References

Toronto Argonauts seasons
1985 Canadian Football League season by team